Charles H. Baker (February 2, 1847 – August 1, 1919) was a Massachusetts state senator (1892–1894) and state representative (1883–1884, 1890–1892). He was a Republican from Lynn, Massachusetts.

Biography
Baker was born February 2, 1847, in Solon, Maine. As a child he moved with his parents to South Weymouth, Massachusetts. During the Civil War he served as a military drummer boy in the 4th Regiment Massachusetts Volunteer Heavy Artillery. After the war he moved to Lynn, where he began working at a shoe factory. After some time he set out on his own, and by the 1890s was a partner in Baker & Creighton, a large-scale manufacturer of shoes. He was a member of the fraternal organization Grand Army of the Republic, and served as commander of the organization in 1883.

In 1880 Baker was elected to the Lynn Common Council, and in 1881 and 1882 he was elected to the Lynn Board of Aldermen. He served a term in the Massachusetts House of Representatives from 1883 to 1884, representing the 10th Essex district. He was again elected as a Lynn aldermen in 1888, then served two more terms in the House from 1890 to 1892, where he served on the Joint Committee on Manufactures.

He was then elected to the Massachusetts Senate, where he represented the 1st Essex district for two terms (1892–1894). For both terms he was chairman of the Joint Committee on Manufactures. He was also a member of the Committee on Labor and Public Service during his first term and the Committee on Drainage and Rapid Transit during his second term.

See also
 114th Massachusetts General Court (1893)

References
 "Charles H. Baker." In 

1847 births
Republican Party members of the Massachusetts House of Representatives
Republican Party Massachusetts state senators
Lynn, Massachusetts City Council members
1919 deaths
19th-century American politicians
People from Solon, Maine
Grand Army of the Republic officials